Ernolatia moorei is a moth in the family Bombycidae first described by Thomas Hutton in 1865. It is found in Sri Lanka, India, southern China, Borneo and Taiwan.

The wingspan is 30–35 mm.

The larvae feed on the leaves of Ficus superba. They have a greyish-brown body and a white head. They reach a length of 4.4 mm when full grown. Pupation takes place in a pale brown pupa, enclosed in a dark brown cocoon spun in the leaves of the host plant.

References

Moths described in 1865
Bombycidae
Moths of Japan